The siege of Chantelle was a Frankish siege of the Aquitanian fortress of Chantelle in 761 during the Aquitanian War. The Frankish army under King Pepin the Short took the fortress in battle. Pepin's army went on to Limoges, laying waste to the province.

Prelude
In 761, King Pepin the Short of Francia took the fortified towns of Bourbon and Clermont and devastated and looted the Duchy of Aquitaine.

Siege
During the campaign, the fort of Chantelle was taken in battle, according to the Royal Frankish Annals.

Aftermath
Many other castles in Auvergne surrendered to Pepin without a fight during the campaign. Pepin proceeded as far as Limoges, burning and looting the province. The conquest and destruction of Auvergne was now complete.

Citations

Bibliography
 
 
 

Chantelle 761
Chantelle
761
8th century in Francia